James Coleman may refer to:

Academics
James Smoot Coleman (1919–1985), American political scientist
James Samuel Coleman (1926–1995), American sociologist
James Earl Coleman (born 1946), American attorney and professor of law

Artists and entertainers
James Coleman (Irish artist) (born 1941)
J. Paul Emerson or Jimmy Coleman (1942/3–2001), American radio host
Jim Coleman (actor) (born 1961), American actor and producer
James Coleman (broadcaster) (born 1968), New Zealand television presenter, radio host and actor
Jim Coleman (musician) (fl. 1990s–2010s), American keyboards and sampler player

Government
James P. Coleman (1914–1991), Governor of Mississippi
James M. Coleman (1924–2014), American jurist and legislator
James Coleman (politician) (fl. 2010s–2020s), member of the Colorado House of Representatives
James H. Coleman (born 1999), Councilmember for the City of South San Francisco
James S. Coleman (judge) (1906–1987), justice of the Supreme Court of Alabama

Sports
James W. Coleman, early 20th-century American basketball coach
Jim Coleman (volleyball), volleyball player for the United States at the 1968 Summer Olympics
Jim Coleman (dancer), dancer who worked with Martha Mason in the 1980s
Jim Coleman (curler), curler in the 2010 Safeway Championship

Other people
Jim Coleman (journalist) (1911–2001), Canadian sports journalist
James J. Coleman (born 1950), American electrical engineer
James Malone Coleman, bishop of the Episcopal Diocese of West Tennessee

Other uses
James Coleman House in Swainsboro, Georgia
James W. Coleman House in Moultrie, Georgia

See also
Coleman (disambiguation)
James Colman, American businessman

Coleman, James